Federación Viguesa de Peñas Recreativas El Olivo, Sección Deportiva is a Spanish sports club from Vigo founded in 1991. It holds women's football, women's futsal and pétanque teams, being best known for the first one, which played in Primera División.

History
El Olivo earned promotion in May 2011 after topping Segunda División's Group 1 and overcoming UD Tacuense and Girona FC in the play-offs, becoming the first team from Galicia to play in Superliga/Primera since the category's unification in 2001. The team was subsequently relegated as it was second to last in its debut season.

On 7 July 2017, despite avoiding the relegation from the Segunda División, the club was sanctioned and relegated due to an illegal alignment of a player during the whole season.

In August 2018, El Olivo announced the dissolution of the football section.

Season to season

References

Women's football clubs in Spain
Association football clubs established in 2001
Football clubs in Galicia (Spain)
Sport in Vigo
Association football clubs disestablished in 2018